Salix mucronata (commonly called the Cape silver willow or Safsaf willow) is a tall, graceful, Semi-Deciduous willow tree. It grows along riverbanks in South Africa, and is used for a wide range of traditional medicines. 
The Cape willow is dioecious (separate male and female trees).

Taxonomy
This variable-looking species was previously subdivided into a number of different species. These have now all been downgraded to just being subspecies of Salix mucronata. These subspecies include: 
 S. m. hirsuta (silver willow) 
 S. m. mucronata (Safsaf willow) 
 S. m. woodii (flute willow) 
 S. m. capensis (small-leaved willow)

References

Plants used in traditional African medicine
Trees of South Africa
Trees of Mediterranean climate
Flora of South Africa
Afromontane flora
mucronata